The Unbelievable Truth is a BBC radio comedy panel game devised by Graeme Garden and Jon Naismith. The game is chaired by David Mitchell and is described in the programme's introduction as 'the panel game built on truth and lies.' The object of the game is for each panellist to deliver a short lecture about a given subject, which should be completely false save for five true statements which they must attempt to smuggle past the other players. The first series began broadcasting in 2007, and the 28th series began airing in April 2022.

Reception
The Guardian's Elisabeth Mahoney reviewed the programme positively: 'From the first moments of its plinky plonky theme tune, The Unbelievable Truth is a delight'. The Guardian's Zoe Williams, however, was critical of the programme, writing: The Unbelievable Truth, for instance, should never have been recommissioned. It's only funny when Clive Anderson is speaking. They could more profitably devise a show that was just Clive Anderson, speaking. Its failures as a quiz are admirably demonstrated by the fact that the scoring is now inverse to the drollery, so that Clive scores no points at all, and Lucy Porter sometimes wins. I don't care about scoring when it's like I'm Sorry I Haven't a Clue'' and it's meant to mean nothing, but they can't all be spoof game-shows. Some of them have to be actual games that work.'

The BBC received "almost 50" complaints about insensitivity after David Mitchell opened a fourth series episode with the joke: "There is absolutely no truth in the rumour that the last line in Anne Frank's diary reads: 'Today is my birthday; dad bought me a drum kit'."

It won the "Best Radio Panel Show" award at the British Comedy Guide's 2011 and 2016 awards. 

Episodes

Winners are highlighted in bold.

Series 1

Series 2

2008 Christmas Special

Series 3

Series 4

2009 New Year's / QI Special

Series 5

Series 6

Series 7

Series 8

Series 9

Series 10

Series 11

Series 12

Series 13

Series 14

Series 15

Series 16

Series 17

Series 18

Series 19

Series 20

Series 21

Series 22

Series 23

Series 24
Series 24 was recorded during the COVID-19 lockdown, with each panelist performing at home.

Series 25
Series 25 was also recorded with the panellists performing from home during lockdown. Two episodes featured three teams of two rather than four panellists playing individually (all three teams consisted of married couples).

 Series 26 

 Series 27 

 Series 28 

International versions

Members from the Australian comedy group The Chaser, including Craig Reucassel, Andrew Hansen and Julian Morrow, have produced a TV series based on the British series.

References
 Notes General Specific'''

External links

2006 radio programme debuts
BBC Radio comedy programmes
BBC Radio 4 programmes
BBC panel games
British panel games
British radio game shows
2000s British game shows
2010s British game shows
Radio programs adapted into television shows
Radio game shows with incorrect disambiguation